The Crab Orchard Formation is a geologic formation in Kentucky. It dates back to the Telychian to Aeronian stages of the Silurian period.

References

Further reading 
 Contributions to the Geology of Kentucky: Silurian System

Geologic formations of Kentucky
Silurian Kentucky
Aeronian
Telychian
Paleontology in Kentucky